Route 22 Is a common name for roads and highways in many countries.

Route 22 may also refer to:

Route 22 (MTA Maryland), a bus route in Baltimore, Maryland, U.S.
London Buses route 22, a bus route in London, UK

22